Dariusz Tadeusz Lipiński (born 4 August 1955 in Warsaw) is a Polish politician. He was elected to the Sejm on 25 September 2005, getting 4,482 votes in 39 Poznań district as a candidate from the Civic Platform list. In the 2007 parliamentary election he got 20,695 votes and was elected for his second term in the Sejm.

See also
Members of Polish Sejm 2005-2007

External links
Dariusz Lipiński - parliamentary page - includes declarations of interest, voting record, and transcripts of speeches.

Members of the Polish Sejm 2005–2007
Civic Platform politicians
1955 births
Living people
Members of the Polish Sejm 2007–2011